Christian Dean (born March 14, 1993) is an American soccer player who currently plays as a center back for Forward Madison FC in USL League One.

Career

Youth 
Dean began his youth soccer career at the youth teams of Palo Alto Football Club, Santa Clara Sporting FC and U.S. Soccer Development Academy club De Anza Force. He was also selected into the National Academy Select 93 teams in 2009 and 2010 for the West and won the 2010 New York Red Bulls National High School Cup. He then went on to attend the University of California, Berkeley where he played college soccer for the California Golden Bears. During the 2013 season Dean was awarded All-Pac-12 and NSCAA Far West Region first-team honors as he led his team to the elite eight in the NCAA.

Vancouver Whitecaps FC 
On January 16, 2014, Dean was selected as the third overall pick in the 2014 MLS SuperDraft by the Vancouver Whitecaps FC on a Generation Adidas contract. He made his professional debut in Major League Soccer on March 16, 2014, against Chivas USA when he came on as a 77th minute for Andy O'Brien as Vancouver drew 1–1.

Chicago Fire 
On August 9, 2017, Dean was acquired by Chicago Fire in exchange for $50,000 of General Allocation Money as well as $50,000 of Targeted Allocation Money, and a percentage of any future transfer fees. He announced his retirement on November 1, 2018.

Charlotte Independence 
On April 24, 2021, Dean returned to professional soccer after two years, signing a contract with USL Championship club Charlotte Independence ahead of the 2021 season.

Bay Cities FC 
Ahead of the 2022 NISA season, Dean joined Bay Cities FC. He scored his first goal for the club on April 23, 2022, against California United Strikers FC.

Forward Madison FC 
On June 8, 2022, Forward Madison FC manager Matt Glaeser announced at a community meeting that the club had signed Dean.

International 

Dean trained with the United States U20 side in 2012. Dean scored his first international goal for the U-23 team in a 30 friendly win over Mexico on April 22, 2015.

Career statistics

References

External links 
 

1993 births
Living people
American soccer players
American expatriate soccer players
California Golden Bears men's soccer players
Vancouver Whitecaps FC players
Vancouver Whitecaps FC U-23 players
Whitecaps FC 2 players
Chicago Fire FC players
Charlotte Independence players
Bay Cities FC players
Forward Madison FC players
Association football defenders
Soccer players from California
Expatriate soccer players in Canada
Vancouver Whitecaps FC draft picks
USL League Two players
Major League Soccer players
National Independent Soccer Association players
United States men's under-23 international soccer players
People from East Palo Alto, California
USL Championship players
USL League One players
De Anza Force players